A Gentleman Preferred is a 1928 American silent comedy Western film directed by Arthur Hotaling and starring Gaston Glass, Jimmy Aubrey and Kathleen Myers.

Cast
 Gaston Glass as James Fargo 
 Jimmy Aubrey as Bill Jenkins 
 Kathleen Myers as Maryann Carter 
 Jerome La Grasse as Lord Stanweight 
 Winifred Landis as Mrs. Clark Carter 
 Jack Hopkins as Kent Carlington 
 Wilson Benge as Dobbs 
 Louise Cabo as Martha

References

External links
 

1928 films
1920s Western (genre) comedy films
1928 comedy films
American black-and-white films
Films directed by Arthur Hotaling
Silent American Western (genre) comedy films
1920s English-language films
1920s American films